The Merkur XR4Ti is a performance-oriented 3-door hatchback sold in North America from 1985 to 1989. A product of the Ford Motor Company, the car was a version of the European Ford Sierra adapted to U.S. regulations. The XR4Ti project was championed by Ford vice president Bob Lutz.

History

The Sierra was the successor to Ford of Europe's Cortina/Taunus and was developed while Lutz was chairman of Ford's European operations. Due to financial restrictions the decision was made to keep the front-engine, rear-wheel-drive layout of its predecessor and pursue improved fuel economy through advanced aerodynamics. The Probe III design study unveiled at the 1981 Frankfurt Motor Show indicated the direction Ford would take with the Sierra. Responsibility for the Sierra design was handled by vice president for design Uwe Bahnsen and chief stylist Patrick le Quément. The Sierra was released in Europe in September 1982, and the performance-oriented XR4i appeared in 1983, slotted into the lineup above the Fiesta-based XR2 and Escort-based XR3.

Lutz spearheaded the plan to bring a version of the XR4i to North America to compete with sporty luxury imports like BMW. Although the car would have to be modified his instructions were that the nature of the car not be compromised. The XR4 for America would be turbocharged, adding a `T' to its name while keeping the `i' indicating a fuel injected engine as in Europe. The `Sierra' name was not used in North America as it was already being used by General Motors for their GMC C/K Sierra pickup truck, and sounded too similar to the Oldsmobile Cutlass Ciera.

With their own production lines occupied building Sierras for the European market, Ford contracted out assembly of the XR4Ti. Using body panels from Ford's factory in Genk, the cars were largely hand-built by Wilhelm Karmann GmbH in Rheine, Germany. The XR4Ti was introduced at a starting price of US$16,503.

Chief executive officer Pete Petersen decided that the car would be sold under the `Merkur' brand name. The name means `Mercury' in German, and tied the new brand in with the Lincoln-Mercury dealers through which the car would be available.  Initially, 800 Lincoln-Mercury dealers enrolled to also become Merkur dealers.

Ford projected sales of 16,000 to 20,000 units per year. These targets were never met, although for the first two years they came close, with over 25,000 units sold. The car continued to struggle to establish its identity in the North American market, both with the public and with dealers.

The increasingly unfavorable dollar/Deutschmark exchange rate put upward pressure on price. By the late 1980s the XR4Ti was facing a redesign to comply with incoming safety regulations in the US. Ford dropped the `Merkur' name in 1988, and began to refer to their two European imports by their model names only. Sales dropped off very rapidly after 1986, so that in its last year fewer than 3,000 XR4Tis were sold. 1989 was the last year for the XR4Ti.

The XR4Ti was the last vehicle imported by Ford into North America from Germany until 2016, when the Ford Focus RS was introduced.

Body, chassis, suspension
The XR4Ti kept the 3-door semi-notchback hatchback body style of the XR4i, including the European version's triple side-window profile and bi-plane rear spoiler. The lower body was clad in polycarbonate `anti-abrasion' panels that were matte grey in the early cars. The car recorded a drag coefficient of 0.328.

The unibody chassis of the European Ford Sierra was modified to meet US safety requirements. The floorpan had reliefs added to accommodate catalytic converters. Side intrusion beams were added to the two doors and the bumpers were stretched to meet US impact requirements. To accommodate the engine for the US-spec car the XR4Ti also received a taller hood.

Suspension was independent front and back. The front suspension comprised Macpherson struts with concentric coil springs and lower lateral links triangulated by an anti-roll bar. The rear suspension used semi-trailing arms with coil springs ahead of the axle half-shafts and shock absorbers behind. An anti-roll bar was also fitted at the rear. Spring rates were softened compared to the XR4i based on feedback from Jackie Stewart, who had been brought in as both a development tester and spokesman for the car. Steering was by a power-assisted rack and pinion with 3.6 turns lock-to-lock. Brakes were  disks in front and  drums at rear. The car had a two-piece driveshaft and used a giubo as a torsional damper.

Engine and transmission
While the European XR4i was powered by a 2.8 L version of the Ford Cologne V6 engine, the only engine offered in the XR4Ti was a turbocharged Lima inline-four. This engine featured a cast-iron block, cast iron cylinder head with 2 valves per cylinder and a single overhead cam driven by a timing belt. The XR4Ti engine also received a Garrett AiResearch turbocharger, fuel-injection and Ford's EEC-IV engine control unit. A nearly identical engine was used in the 1983 Mustang Turbo GT and 1983 Thunderbird Turbo coupe. The XR4Ti did not have the intercooler found in the 1984 SVO Mustang or 1987-88 Thunderbird Turbo coupe.

The second-order vibrations produced by this large four cylinder engine had been noticeable when it was used in the turbocharged Thunderbird and Cougar models. To minimize these in the XR4Ti without resorting to extreme measures such as adding balance shafts, extensive work was done to reduce noise, vibration, and harshness (NVH) in the power-train. The first measure taken to reduce NVH was to redesign the engine's external components, including the intake manifold, to increase the stiffness of the bracketing and lighten the components. The second measure was to reduce the amount of vibration transmitted to the body structure by using soft rubber engine mounts. Engine roll was controlled by wide-based mounting brackets and engine movement due to bumps was limited by having the brackets attached to the body via hydraulic mounts.

The base transmission was a 5-speed manual Ford Type 9 unit, while a Ford C3 3-speed automatic transmission was optional.

Options, updates, special editions
The XR4Ti arrived on the market with an extensive list of standard and optional equipment.

1985:
 Standard equipment includes flush headlamps, variable ratio power steering, power mirrors, power disc brakes, nitrogen-pressurized shock-absorbers. 
 Interior equipment includes air conditioning, a 60/40 folding rear seat, and an AM/FM stereo with integrated cassette player.
 A manual transmission is standard and an automatic is optional. Most cars are equipped with manuals.
  Tires are Pirelli P6 195/60HR14 fitted to 14-inch 8-hole "phone dial" alloy wheels.
 Other features, like  power windows, power door locks, cruise control, leather seats, heated front seats, manual moon-roof, and metallic paint, are extra-cost options.

Many changes were made to the car over its five-year life. These include:

1986:
 A central high-mounted stop light is integrated into the lower rear wing.
 Windows now roll down below sill edge.
 Driver's side wiper airfoil is dropped.
 Turbocharger outlet tube is now smooth.
 Heater core is upgraded. (Late year change)

1987:
 The XR4Ti inherits many upgrades from the European Sierra Mk.II chassis, including a wider transmission tunnel and different pedal spacing.
 A monochromatic paint scheme that matches the lower body cladding color to the rest of the body becomes a mid-year option. Colors are black, red or white.
 The standard alloy wheels are upgraded to 15-inch 8-slot "pie-spoke" units.
 Tires are now Pirelli P6 195/60HR15.
 The dashboard is redesigned to address premature cracking experienced by earlier cars.
 The diamond-shaped `Merkur' badge on the rear is replaced with simple “Merkur” text on the deck-lid.
 The fender-mounted antenna is replaced by an antenna trace bonded to the glass of the rear hatch.
 Redesigned steering reduces turns lock-to-lock to 2.42, and turning circle to 35.4 feet.
 The engine receives a new cam cover.
 The sound system is changed. Joystick balance control is removed.
 Three new paint colors are available.
 Oil level sensor and dash indicator is deleted.

1988:
 The bi-plane rear spoiler is replaced by a simpler single-level wing.
 The rear hatch gets a larger glass panel in the hatch with the change of wing, which combines to raise the coefficient of drag.
 The standard alloy wheels are changed to a BBS-style cast wire-spoke model.
 Beige/brown cladding now offered depending on body color.
 Speedometer scale now goes to 150 mph.
 New interior colors are available.

1989:
 The dashboard ends are shortened slightly to allow the A-pillar trim to extend past it.
 Cruise-control becomes standard equipment.
 Coolant overflow bottle is relocated.

In addition to the changes above many modifications were incorporated as Technical Service Bulletins.

A number of automotive customizers produced versions of the XR4Ti that offered increased performance and improved handling. Among these companies were Roush, Rapido, and RC Consultants. These versions were often sold as either owner-installed kits or pre-built vehicles. One such special, built by Ralph Todd and called the Scorch XS replaced the Ford engine with a Nissan VG30DETT twin-turbocharged V6. Only one of these US$50,000 conversions was built; Scorch Prototype #001. The other Scorch cars were never completed and ultimately dismantled. 

Ford only offered one special edition of the XR4Ti when, in a 1987 tie-in with ski manufacturer K2 Sports, the XR4Ti K2 appeared. This all-white model came with colored K2 logos on the front fenders and a roof-mounted ski rack. No mechanical changes were made to the K2 version.

Performance reviews and legacy
In later tests by the same magazine the car took 7.8 seconds to accelerate from 0-60 mph, leading the testers to speculate that the earlier press car might have been a ringer, a not-uncommon practice at the time. In their test data they stated the press car came with a limited slip differential, something that was not offered as standard or an option for the XR4Ti during its production.

Numbers from the March 1985 road test by Road & Track magazine are comparable. Their car ran from 0-60 mph in 7.9 seconds and reached the end of the quarter mile in 16.0 seconds. Lateral acceleration was measured at 0.767 Gs and the car ran through the R&T slalom at a speed of 59.7 mph.

Contemporary reviews of the car often mention either the non-intuitive pronunciation of the brand name or the car's polarizing appearance. Most praise the car's handling, while recognizing areas where it falls short of expectations. Some felt the car showed more body roll while cornering than desired. The disk/drum brake system was felt to be adequate but not outstanding. Others were disappointed that no anti-lock was offered. While Car and Driver's first report went into great detail about Ford's efforts to reduce NVH, their later tests reported that there was still noticeable vibration in the drive-line. Effective use of the car has hampered by what some felt was the engine's narrow power band.

Even after production ended the car continued to provoke widely differing opinions. The XR4Ti was on Car and Driver's Ten Best list for 1985. In 2009 however, the magazine listed that honor as one of the "most embarrassing" awards in automotive history.

In addition to Car and Driver's change of heart some have numbered the XR4Ti among the 10 worst cars ever made, and "not (Ford's) finest hour".

On the other hand, other articles have called it one of the 10 best forgotten cars, and a car that had unfairly received a bad reputation.

Motorsport

Despite the XR4Ti never being sold outside of the United States and Canada, Andy Rouse campaigned one in the British Saloon Car Championship. Rouse took the overall title for the 1985 season and the class title for 1986 with 14 wins. In 1986, Eggenberger Motorsport was among the few to use an XR4Ti to compete in the European Touring Car Championship and the Deutsche Tourenwagen Meisterschaft (German Touring Car Championship) with positive results. Ford used technical feedback from the teams racing the XR4Ti to develop the 1986 Ford Sierra RS Cosworth, which first appeared on race tracks in 1987 and was superseded in mid-1987 by the Ford Sierra RS500. Some of the body panels used to stiffen the Sierra chassis and create the Merkur shell were subsequently branded 909 Motorsport parts for later adaptation to a Sierra shell. Many see the successes and failures of the XR4Ti as being the blueprint for success of the dominant RS500 Sierras.

Between 1986 and 1987, Pete Halsmer and Scott Pruett campaigned the Roush-prepped XR4Ti, although of a tubeframe construction like that of a silhouette racing car, to take the Trans-Am Series title. Along with Paul Miller, the pair also campaigned an XR4Ti successfully in the IMSA series in 1988.

Production figures

See also
 
 Ford Granada (Europe)
 Ford Scorpio

Explanatory notes

References

Further reading

External links

Merkur Desktop—a directory of webpages related to Merkur

XR4Ti
Cars introduced in 1985
Coupés
Hatchbacks
Karmann vehicles
Rear-wheel-drive vehicles
Sports cars
Cars discontinued in 1989